Food moisture analysis involves the whole coverage of the food items in the world because foods are comprising a considerable amount of water rather than other ingredients. Foods are vital components which are consumed by the people at each and every moment for the surviving in the world. Basically there are several kinds of foods are available for the consumption as raw foods, processed foods and modified foods in the market. Moisture content of the food material is important to consider the food is suitable before the consumption, because moisture content affects the physical, chemical aspects of food which relates with the freshness and stability for the storage of the food for a long period of time and the moisture content determine the actual quality of the food before consumption and to the subsequent processing in the food sector by the food producers.

Why food moisture analysis is important 
Food    moisture analysis involves the amount of moisture content and the concentration of moisture by measuring qualitatively and quantitatively. The food processing companies and the "Research and Development" (R&D) people of the food producing company, food related peoples, graduates, undergraduates and the high school students must be well aware of the moisture analysis of the food which do a lot in the food safety and storage conditions and the shelf life of the food. Moisture content analysis is important in determining the shelf life of foods and products

Legal and labeling requirements 
Legal limitations regarding the amount of water present in the food is necessary for producing some of the specific products. For example, there should be less than 40% of moisture during the production of cheddar cheese.

Economically important requirements 
 
Moisture present in the food material is related with some type of food is dealing with economical values and the big business among industries therefore, food moisture analysis plays a significant role in the modern world.

Shelf life of the food or food products 
Further, microbial activity of the food materials favor with the moisture availability in the food. Moisture rich foods are easily susceptible to the microbial attack and got rotted and damaged. Thus the shelf life of the food material is determined by the moisture content in the food. Low moisture foods usually slow down growth of microorganisms hence the need for analysis and control of food moisture.

Food quality measurements 
Quality of the food is determined in terms of the food texture, taste, and appearance but moisture content of the food is a determination factor of the quality and the stability of the processed food products.

Food processing operations 
Food processing operations are involved with the amount of moisture content present in the food item which is going to be processed for a specific purpose.

See also 
 Moisture analysis
 Food analysis
 Analytical chemistry
 Food Science
 Food Chemistry

References 
 Isengard HD. Water content, one of the most important properties of food. Food Control. 2001;12(7):395-400.
 Mulvaney TR. In: Cunniff P, ed. Official Methods of Analysis of AOAC International. 16th ed. Arlington, Va.; 1995:42-1-42-2.

Bibliography 
 Pearson, D (1973), Laboratory Techniques in Food Analysis, Butterworth & co (publishers) ltd, London, first edition, 315p.
 Suzanne Nielsen, S.,(2010),Food analysis, Springer, Fourth edition, 602p.
 James, C.S., (1996). Analytical chemistry Foods, New york, Blackie Academics and professional

External links 
 http://people.umass.edu/~mcclemen/581Moisture.html
 http://www.foodquality.com/details/article/806493/Moisture_Content_Analysis.html

Food science